Most commonly referred to as Scammell's light, light corps, or detachment, this was a light infantry regiment under the new organization of the Continental Army prescribed by George Washington in his General Orders of November 1, 1780.  The regiment was formed on May 17, 1781.  Washington's intent for the regiment is clearly stated in a letter from him Scammell on the same date:

George Washington to Alexander Scammell

Formation and Early Operations in the Highlands
General Washington gave command of the regiment to Alexander Scammell to honor his services as Adjutant General and to honor Scammell's wishes to command an active line unit.  The men of this unit were selected from the Continental Line regiments from Connecticut, Massachusetts, and New Hampshire.  Among the men under Scammell's command was Henry Dearborn who later became U.S. Secretary of War under President Thomas Jefferson.

Prelude to Yorktown
The regiment was active in the subterfuge that ensured Sir Henry Clinton's forces in New York City stayed there in a defensive posture, allowing Washington's army to make their way southward to Yorktown.

Battle of Yorktown
Alexander Scammell was wounded, and died a few days later in early October 1781. The regiment was divided, with companies being assigned to John Laurens and Alexander Hamilton. Some of these companies participated in the battle to take redoubt number 10 under the command of the Marquis de Lafayette.

References

Bibliography

Military units and formations established in 1781
Military units and formations of the Continental Army